Etheldreda Janet Laing (née Winkfield, 1872–1960) was a British photographer who is remembered for her early Autochrome photographs, which she began taking in 1908.

Biography
Born in Ely in 1872, Etheldreda was the daughter of Richard Winkfield, head of the King's School. After studying drawing in Cambridge, she married the barrister Charles Miskin Laing in 1895, after which the couple lived in Oxford. In 1899, they moved to Bury Knowle House in the Oxford district of Headington.  Enthralled with photography, which she appears to have practiced since the late 1890s, Etheldreda had her own darkroom built in the house.  She showed an immediate interest in the Autochrome colour process when the plates first became available in 1907. From 1908 she took many photographs of her daughters Janet and Iris in the garden. In later life she painted miniatures and joined the Royal Miniature Society.

Laing showed great care in her compositions, taking carefully posed shots, mainly in the garden where the light was good. There is also an indoor photograph of Janet in Japanese kimono, which was popular at the time. It probably required an exposure of up to one minute.

References

External links
Etheldreda Laing's Autochromes (1908–1910) from Science and Society

1872 births
1960 deaths
20th-century English women artists
20th-century women photographers
Artists from Oxford
English women photographers
Photographers from Oxfordshire